Celebration: The Video Collection is a greatest videos DVD compilation by American singer-songwriter Madonna. Released by Warner Bros. Records on September 29, 2009, the release accompanied the greatest hits compilation Celebration (2009). The collection follows on from her other greatest videos compilations The Immaculate Collection (1990) and The Video Collection 93:99 (1999). The release of the DVD was announced in July 2009 and contained videos spanning Madonna's entire career from 1983 to 2009.

Contemporary critics gave mixed reviews of the DVD. Some were disappointed with the low quality and the lack of clarity of the videos, while others praised the collection for being a reminder of Madonna as the visual artist. Celebration: The Video Collection debuted at the top of the Billboard Top Music Videos and the top of the DVD charts in Australia, Czech Republic, Hungary, Spain and Switzerland. It was certified platinum by the Recording Industry Association of America (RIAA) for shipment of 100,000 copies across United States.

Background
On March 18, 2009, Madonna's publicist Liz Rosenberg announced the plans for the release of a greatest hits package by September. On July 22, 2009, Warner Bros. Records officially announced the release date as September 28, 2009 and confirmed the name of the album as Celebration through Madonna's official website, adding that a DVD containing Madonna's best music videos would also be released.  According to the official press statement, the DVD included unedited and never before seen footage of "Justify My Love", as well as the completed video of the single "Celebration". The music videos included on the DVD were selected by Madonna and her fans through her official website Icon. The cover for Celebration was created by street pop artist Mr. Brainwash who is best known for "throwing modern cultural icons into a blender and turning it up to eleven". The compilation included the music videos of "Burning Up", "Into the Groove", "True Blue", "Who's That Girl", "Erotica", "Deeper and Deeper", "I Want You", "I'll Remember" and  "American Pie", which were previously never included in any of Madonna's DVDs. It also included the award-winning music videos – "Like a Virgin", "Papa Don't Preach", "Open Your Heart", "Like a Prayer", "Express Yourself", "Vogue", "Rain", "Take a Bow", "Frozen", "Ray of Light", "Beautiful Stranger", "Music", "Don't Tell Me" and "Hung Up". "Justify My Love" and "Erotica" were banned by MTV for their sexually provocative themes. The video is presented in 4:3 aspect ratio, with the widescreen videos windowboxed.

Reception

Critical response
Douglas Wolk from Pitchfork Media commented that the DVD was "a lot closer to the mark [of celebrating Madonna's career]. A lot of the fun of her career has always been its visual side." Don Shewey from Rolling Stone said, "The video exemplified the fact that there's no-one like Madonna, who can turn the music video in to an art-form." Chad Presley from Blogcritics felt that, "There's a healthy dose of nostalgia involved in watching these videos for anyone who grew up during the 1980s in particular. [...] The video quality is a mixed bag. Most of the visual problems crop up during the earlier clips, which were photographed on much more primitive equipment. [...] All things considered, especially when viewed on a Blu-ray player and hi-def TV, this is a pretty rough looking set. Even some of the later videos have an excess of visual noise and are lacking in sharpness." Ian Sturges from Daily Mirror commented, "Celebration is a journey [of Madonna] from coquettish wannabe to pop goddess to institution. [...] The videos parallel this transformation from her innocent cavorting on a Venetian gondola for 'Like a Virgin' to the determinedly X-rated couplings of 'Justify My Love' and 'Erotica', both of which were banned. Monica Herrera from Billboard was not impressed with the collection and was disappointed with the "dull quality of the videos. The collection is a probable shame in Madonna's catalogue, but a great one for her fans." Bönz Malone from Spin said, "Celebration: The Video Collection is a reminder that Madonna is, and always will be, a true video artist. You cannot ignore her contribution to the music video art form." Tim Sendra from Allmusic gave the DVD four and a half stars out of five, and commented that "it is indeed a celebration of Madonna's career and some of the most celebratory and thrilling pop music ever created."

Commercial performance
Celebration: The Video Collection debuted at the top of the Billboard Top Music Videos for the issue dated October 12, 2009, replacing Beyoncé's live release I Am... Yours: An Intimate Performance at Wynn Las Vegas. It remained on the top of the music video chart for five weeks. The DVD was certified platinum by the Recording Industry Association of America (RIAA) for shipment of 50,000 copies. According to Nielsen Soundscan, the DVD has sold 60,000 copies in United States as of December 2010 and placed at number 30 on the year-end DVD chart for 2009.

On October 5, 2009, the DVD debuted at the top of the ARIA Top 40 Music DVD chart in Australia with 2,300 copies in its first-week, replacing Believe Again: Australian Tour 2009 by Delta Goodrem.  After two weeks on the top, Celebration: The Video Collection was replaced by Funhouse Tour: Live in Australia by Pink. The collection was present on the DVD chart for twenty weeks, and ranked at twenty on the Australian Highest Selling Music DVD chart for 2009. The DVD debuted at the top of the Hungarian Top 20 DVD chart on September 27, 2009, and was present for one week on the top. In Czech Republic, the DVD debuted at the top of the DVD chart on October 14, 2009, replacing Madonna's compilation album Celebration. Celebration: The Video Collection also received a two-times platinum certification in France, for shipment of 30,000 copies of the video.

Track listing and formats
{{tracklist
| headline = Celebration: The Video Collection <ref name="liner">{{cite AV media notes|others=Madonna |title=Celebration: The Video Collection|year=2009 |type=DVD/CD |chapter=Inlay credits|publisher= Warner Bros.| id=9362-49729-6}}</ref>
| extra_column    = Director(s)
| title1          = Burning Up
| writer1         = Madonna
| extra1          = Steve Barron
| length1         = 3:40
| title2          = Lucky Star
| writer2         = Madonna
| extra2          = Arthur Pierson
| length2         = 4:01
| title3          = Borderline
| writer3         = Reggie Lucas
| extra3          = Mary Lambert
| length3         = 3:56
| title4          = Like a Virgin
| writer4         = 
| extra4          = Lambert
| length4         = 3:48
| title5          = Material Girl
| writer5         = 
| extra5          = Lambert
| length5         = 4:43
| title6          = Crazy for You
| writer6         = 
| extra6          = Harold Becker
| length6         = 3:59
| title7          = Into the Groove
| writer7         = 
| extra7          = Susan Seidelman
| length7         = 3:50
| title8          = Live to Tell
| writer8         = 
| extra8          = James Foley
| length8         = 4:24
| title9          = Papa Don't Preach
| writer9         = Brian Elliot (additional lyrics by Madonna)
| extra9          = Foley
| length9         = 5:06
| title10          = True Blue
| writer10         = 
| extra10          = Foley
| length10         = 4:02
| title11          = Open Your Heart
| writer11         = 
| extra11          = Jean-Baptiste Mondino
| length11         = 4:28
| title12          = La Isla Bonita
| writer12         = 
| extra12          = Lambert
| length12         = 3:59
| title13          = Who's That Girl
| writer13         = 
| extra13          = Peter Rosenthal
| length13         = 3:44
| title14          = Like a Prayer
| writer14         = 
| extra14          = Lambert
| length14         = 5:43
| title15          = Express Yourself
| writer15         = 
| extra15          = David Fincher
| length15         = 4:59
| title16          = Cherish
| writer16         = 
| extra16          = Herb Ritts
| length16         = 4:38
| title17          = Vogue
| writer17         = 
| extra17          = Fincher
| length17         = 4:51
| title18          = Justify My Love
| writer18         = 
| extra18          = Mondino
| length18         = 4:57
| title19          = Erotica
| writer19         = 
| extra19          = Fabien Baron
| length19         = 5:18
| title20          = Deeper and Deeper
| writer20         = 
| extra20          = Bobby Woods
| length20         = 5:49
| title21          = Rain
| writer21         = 
| extra21          = Mark Romanek
| length21         = 4:33
| title22          = I'll Remember
| writer22         = 
| extra22          = Alek Keshishian
| length22         = 4:19
}}

Notes
The nudity in "Justify My Love" and "Erotica" has been censored by black bars.

Formats
The DVD collection has been released in two different versions — both of them double-disc releases.
Keep case — DVD-size packaging
DVD Digipak — CD-size packaging
iTunes Store digital download — deluxe video edition of Celebration'' with 68 tracks, including 38 audio tracks and 30 music videos

Charts

Monthly charts

Year-end charts

Certifications and sales

Release history

References

External links
Madonna.com > News > Celebration
 

2009 compilation albums
2009 video albums
Madonna video albums
Madonna compilation albums
Music video compilation albums
Warner Records video albums
Warner Records compilation albums